Jylan Ware (born October 16, 1993) is a former American football offensive tackle. He played college football at Alabama State, and was drafted in the seventh round of the 2017 NFL Draft by the Oakland Raiders.

College career 
Playing at Alabama State University, Ware started for three years. His main tools in college were above-average athleticism and good hands.

Professional career

Oakland Raiders
Ware was drafted by the Oakland Raiders in the seventh round, 231st overall, in the 2017 NFL Draft.

On September 1, 2018, Ware was waived by the Raiders.

New York Giants
On October 2, 2018, Ware was signed to the New York Giants' practice squad. He signed a reserve/future contract with the Giants on January 2, 2019. He was waived on April 30, 2019.

Washington Redskins
Ware signed with Washington Redskins on May 28, 2019, but was waived two days later.

Personal life 
Ware had offers to play basketball in college but instead decided to play football. He earned his bachelor's degree in rehabilitation services from Alabama State.

References

External links 

Alabama State Hornets bio
Oakland Raiders bio

1993 births
Living people
People from Valley, Alabama
Players of American football from Alabama
American football offensive tackles
Alabama State Hornets football players
Oakland Raiders players
New York Giants players
Washington Redskins players